Money Talks: The Album is the soundtrack to Brett Ratner's 1997 comedy film Money Talks. It was released on August 12, 1997 through Arista Records and featured hip hop and R&B music. The album peaked at 37 on the Billboard 200 and 6 on the Top R&B/Hip-Hop Albums, and was certified gold by the RIAA on December 19, 1997.

Track listing

Note: "If You Want Me to Stay" by Sly and the Family Stone was featured in the movie but was not included on the soundtrack.

Charts

Weekly charts

Year-end charts

Certifications

References

External links

1997 soundtrack albums
Hip hop soundtracks
Arista Records soundtracks
Albums produced by Stevie J
Albums produced by Timbaland
Albums produced by Sean Combs
Albums produced by David Gamson
Albums produced by Jermaine Dupri
Albums produced by Organized Noize
Action film soundtracks
Comedy film soundtracks